Shafter High School is a public high school in Shafter, California, United States, a city north of Bakersfield, California.

Academics
As of 2013, Shafter High School operates on a 7:58 a.m. to 3:05 p.m. schedule. This includes seven periods of instruction and a lunch.

Enrollment
In the 2011–12 school year, Shafter High School had an enrollment of 1,494 students. Shafter High School is integrated in the school years of 2011-2012 with, 0.3% American Indian/Alaska Native, 0.7% Asian, 0.1% Native Hawaiian/Pacific Islander, 0.2% Filipino, 89% Hispanic, 0.9% Black, and 8.1% White.

Athletics
Currently, the school offers 9 sports teams for students.  These sports include baseball/softball, basketball, golf, football, wrestling, volleyball, track and field, soccer, and tennis.

Notable alumni
Anna Jelmini – track and field athlete. 
Dean Florez – former California State Senator from the 16th Senate District.

References

External links

Shafter High School website
Kern High School District

Public high schools in California
High schools in Kern County, California